The Czech Men's Volleyball Extraliga is a men's volleyball competition organized by the Czech Volleyball Association (ČVS), it was created in 1992 Just after the dissolution of Czechoslovakia.

League Previous Names
1992–1998 : Volejbalová extraliga mužů
1998–2010 : Kooperativa volejbalová extraliga mužů
2010–Present : UNIQA volejbalová extraliga mužů

History 
In the 2020/21 championship, 12 teams played in the Extraliga: Karlovarsko ( Karlovy Vary ), Jihostroy ( Ceske Budejovice ), Dukla ( Liberec ), Lions ( Prague ), Usti nad Labem, Ostrava, Aero ( Odolena-Voda ), Kladno, Brno, Black Valley Beskydy ( Frydek-Mistek ), Prishbram, Fatra ( Zlín ).

Winners list

References

External links
 Přehled vítězů na sport.idnes.cz
 Přehled vítězů na str. českého volejbalového svazu

Czech Republic
Sports leagues established in 1992
Volleyball in the Czech Republic
Professional sports leagues in the Czech Republic